Janet Hsieh (born January 20, 1980) is a Taiwanese-American television personality, violinist, author, and model based in Taipei, Taiwan. She is the host of the Discovery Travel and Living Channel's long-running series Fun Taiwan. The program is currently in its 13th season and has expanded to include Fun Asia and Fun Taiwan Challenge. She has been nominated four times for the Taiwanese Golden Bell Awards as Best Host of a Travel Program, and once for Best Host of a Variety Program.

Early life and education
Hsieh was born on January 20, 1980, in Houston, Texas, where she was raised. Her father hails from Kaohsiung and her mother from Taipei. She has one elder sister. She graduated from Bellaire Senior High School in 1997.

In 2001, Hsieh graduated from the Massachusetts Institute of Technology with a Bachelor of Science degree in Biology and Spanish. During her time at MIT, she was a member of the Alpha Chi Omega women's fraternity and served on the university's Ring Committee, the group responsible for designing the MIT class ring. She also ran the Boston Marathon during this time.

She also studied at the Universidad de Buenos Aires in Argentina and at the University of California, Los Angeles in California.

Hsieh commands English (native speaker), Chinese (with fluency in both Mandarin and Taiwanese) as well as French and Spanish fluently.

Career

Volunteer and EMT 
After graduation from college, Hsieh spent time in Jamshedpur as a community outreach volunteer. She also received certification as an EMT from Boston EMS/MIT, and in September 2001 went to Taiwan for a medical residential internship, where she completed a six-month stint at Taipei Veterans General Hospital in Tienmu. She also worked in India in the city of Jamshedpur for Tata Steel.

Modeling 
In 2002, at the end of her medical internship, Hsieh met Jeff Huang of the Taiwanese rap group L.A. Boyz, as well as rising star Vanness Wu outside the popular Taipei nightclub, Room 18. On recommendations from Huang and Wu, Hsieh auditioned for being taller than other women, eventually landing an underwear commercial.

Television 
In 2005, Hsieh auditioned for a new Discovery Travel and Living television series exploring the island of Taiwan, entitled Fun Taiwan. Since landing the role, she has been nominated four times for Best Host in a Travel Program at the Golden Bell Awards, achieving a win in 2011, and has been one of the longest running series on Discovery Channel's TLC (Asia).

Music 
Hsieh learned to play the violin at age five and was part of the Texas Young Virtuosos, who played at the White House for President George Bush and in Europe. In Taiwan, she has performed three concerts at the National Concert Hall, twice in 2011 and again in 2013. She also played as one of 4,645 participants at Changhua Stadium in 2011, joining Changhua County youth to set a Guinness World Record for "Largest Violin Ensemble."

Author 
Hsieh published her first Chinese-language travel book, Traveling with 100 Toothbrushes, in 2010. She has since published two additional travel-related titles, Backpack to the Future and Au for You, as well as two English learning books, Janet's Funtastic English and j@net.com.

In 2016, Hsieh and her husband George Young co-authored the book Starting at The End (Chinese language title: "在世界的盡頭說：我願意"). The book shares their sometimes conflicting stories on how they met, as well as their fifty-day journey through Texas, Argentina, and through to their wedding in Antarctica.

Personal life 
Hsieh married George Young in January 2015. They have two sons, one born in 2017 and the other in 2021.

Hsieh holds a black belt in Taekwondo and is a trained sushi chef and circus performer.

Filmography

Television 
Hsieh has served as the host of numerous programs on Discovery Travel and Living, including Fun Taiwan, as well as programs on local Taiwanese television networks, such as Aqua Challenge.

Film 
 Big Three Dragons (2019)
 Frozen, as Anna (Taiwanese Mandarin voiceover)
 Traversal 101 (2013), as Xiao Na 
 Big Brother Ohaev (2007), as Jenny
 A Bread Factory (2018), as May

Music videos 
 Sneezing by Yen-j (2012)
 3 Idiots by Mayday (2011)
 What's Wrong with Rock?! by Leehom Wang (2008)
 Setting You Free by Nicky Lee (2005)

References

External links 

 

Living people
1980 births
American people of Taiwanese descent
American women musicians of Chinese descent
People from Houston
American female taekwondo practitioners
American television hosts
American models of Taiwanese descent
American violinists
American people of Chinese descent
21st-century violinists
American women television presenters
21st-century American women